The Nieuwpoort–Dunkirk Canal (Dutch Kanaal Nieuwpoort–Duinkerke, French Canal Nieuport–Dunkerque)  is a canal which links the Belgian coastal town of Nieuwpoort with the French port Dunkirk.

The canal starts at the so-called Ganzepoot lock complex at the mouth of the Yser in Nieuwpoort, where it connects the Yser, the North Sea and the Plassendale–Nieuwpoort Canal. The canal first circles around the old city center and then turns eastward, past the village of Wulpen in the municipality of Koksijde. Then the canal turns inland towards the city of Veurne, where it connects with the  Canal. The canal goes around Veurne, and then bends back towards the shoreline by Adinkerke. After almost  in Belgium, the canal continues into France, passing the communes of Bray-Dunes and Zuydcoote. In Dunkirk it connects again to the North Sea where the Nieuwpoort–Dunkirk Canal finally ends in linkups with the Bourbourg and Bergues canals.

The Canal de Furnes is the French name for the portion of the Nieuwpoort–Dunkirk Canal running in France, from Dunkirk to the Belgian border town of Veurne (Fr. Furnes).  The Belgian border is at PK13.

See also
 List of canals in Belgium
 List of canals in France

References

Furnes